is a Japanese gravure idol, tarento, and actress signed to Japan Art.

Biography
Born in Otaru, Hokkaidō, Kawamura grew up in Yokohama, Kanagawa and later in Abiko, Chiba. She made her debut in 2003 as a gravure idol. In 2006 she started her career as an actress. On November 22, 2019, Kawamura announced that she married Back Number drummer, Hisashi Kurihara. On November 20, 2021, Kawamura announced on her Twitter account that she had given birth to her first child.

Filmography

Films
  (2006)
  (2008)
  (2009)
  (2009)
 Battle of Demons (2009)
  (2014)
 Hōzuki-san Chi no Aneki (2014)
 Inemuri Iwane (2019)

TV dramas
 Donto Hare (2007)
 Juken Sentai Gekiranger as Cherry (2007, episode 36)
 Ultraseven X (2007)
 Mirai Seiki Shakespeare (2008)

References

External links
Official web site 
Official blog 
Official blog 
 

1986 births
Living people
Japanese gravure models
Japanese television personalities
People from Otaru
Japanese actresses